Reed Farrel Coleman (born March 29, 1956) is an American writer of crime fiction and a poet.

Life and career 
Reed Farrel Coleman, the youngest of three boys, was born and raised in the Sheepshead Bay, Coney Island, Brighton Beach section of Brooklyn. As a teenager, while walking to work, he heard a shot and saw a man lying in the street with a fatal stomach wound. That is when he realized, "People really do get hurt." He started writing in high school. He has worked at an ice cream store, in air freight at Kennedy Airport, as a car leasing agent, in baby food sales, cooking at a restaurant, as a cab driver, and delivering home heating oil. Coleman met his wife Rosanne at The New School in a writing class. They have two children, Kaitlin and Dylan. He now lives on Long Island.

Coleman did not consider making writing a career until taking a Brooklyn College detective fiction class.    He is a multiple award-winning author, particularly his Moe Prager series. Also published are series featuring protagonists Gulliver Dowd, Dylan Klein, and Joe Serpe. The Dowd character was based on a retired police detective that he had met. The Joe Serpe novels were originally written under the pen name Tony Spinosa, but are now available as Coleman titles. He has written the stand-alone novels Tower with Ken Bruen, Bronx Reqiem with Det. (ret.) John Roe of the NYPD, and Gun Church, as well as several short stories, essays, and poems. Coleman has won Anthony, Audie, Barry, Macavity and Shamus Awards.     His books and stories have additionally been nominated for Gumshoe and Edgar Awards.     The books have been translated into seven languages.

He considers William Blake, Lawrence Block, T.S. Eliot, Wallace Stevens, William Carlos Williams, Raymond Chandler and Dashiell Hammett to be early influences. Later he found  significance in the writing of colleagues Peter Blauner, Ken Bruen, Jim Fusilli, S.J. Rozan, and Peter Spiegelman. He says, though, that his single greatest writing influence was his college poetry professor, David Lehman, who provided "permission to be a writer and...the first clues on self-editing".     NPR has referred to him as "a hard-boiled poet", The Huffington Post says, "Coleman is the resident noir poet laureate of the United States" and The New York Times has commented, "If you dragged one (of his books) across the asphalt, you'd half-expect it to leave a chalk outline".

With a four-book contract, Coleman takes over writing Robert B. Parker's Jesse Stone series with the September 2014 publication of Blind Spot. He has also been signed to a two-book deal featuring retired Suffolk County (NY) cop turned PI Gus Murphy.     He is an adjunct instructor of English at Hofstra University, a former Executive Vice President of Mystery Writers of America, and a founding member of Mystery Writers of America University.

Bibliography

Dylan Klein series 
 Life Goes Sleeping, Permanent Press, 1991. 
 Little Easter, Permanent Press, 1993. 
 They Don't Play Stickball in Milwaukee, Permanent Press, 1997.

Moe Prager series 
 Walking the Perfect Square, Permanent Press, 2001. 
 Redemption Street, Viking, 2004. 
 The James Deans, Plume, 2005. 
 Soul Patch, Bleak House Books, 2007. 
 Empty Ever After, Bleak House Books, 2008. 
 Innocent Monster, Tyrus Books, 2010. 
 Hurt Machine, Tyrus Books, 2011. 
 Onion Street, Tyrus Books, 2013. 
 The Hollow Girl, F+W Media, Inc., 2014.

Joe Serpe series 
(writing as Tony Spinosa)
 Hose Monkey, Bleak House Books, 2006. 
 The Fourth Victim, Bleak House Books, 2008.

Gulliver Dowd series 
 Dirty Work, Raven Books [Orca Book Publishers], 2013. 
 Valentino Pier,  Raven Books [Orca Book Publishers], 2013. 
The Boardwalk, Raven Books [Orca Book Publishers], 2015. 
Love and Fear, Raven Books [Orca Book Publishers] , 2016.

Gus Murphy series 
 Where It Hurts, 2016. 
 What You Break, 2016.

Robert B. Parker's Jesse Stone
 Blind Spot, G.P. Putnam, 2014. 
 The Devil Wins, G.P. Putnam, 2015.
Debt to Pay, G.P. Putnam, 2016. .
The Hangman’s Sonnet, Penguin Random House, 2017.
Colorblind, Penguin Random House, 2018.
The Bitterest Pill, Penguin Random House, 2019.
Fallout, Penguin Random House, 2022

Standalone novels 
 Tower (with Ken Bruen), Busted Flush Press, 2009. 
 Bronx Requiem: a detective Jack Kenny mystery (with John Roe), Hyperion, 2012. 
 Gun Church, Tyrus, 2012.

Essays and short stories 
(a selection)

Fiction 
 "Portrait of the Killer As a Young Man"Dublin Noir: The Celtic Tiger Vs. the Ugly American, ed. Ken Bruen, Akashic Books, 2006, pp. 61–66. 
 "Killing O'Malley" (as Tony Spinosa)Hardboiled Brooklyn, ed. Coleman, Bleak House, 2006, pp. 108–115. 
 "Bat-Head Speed"These Guns for Hire, ed. by J. A. Konrath, Bleak House, 2006, pp. 299–306. 
 "Another Role"Indian Country Noir, eds. Sarah Cortez & Liz Martínez, Akashic Books, 2010, pp. 214–238. 
 "Mastermind" (fr. Long Island Noir, ed. K. Jones)USA Noir: Best of the Akashic Noir Series, ed. Johnny Temple, Akashic Books, 2013, pp 170–179. 
 "The Terminal"Kwik Krimes, ed. Otto Penzler, Thomas & Mercer, 2013, pp. 93–96.

Nonfiction 
 "Go East, Young Man: Robert B. Parker, Jesse Stone, and Spenser"In Pursuit of Spenser: Mystery Writers on Robert B. Parker and the Creation of an American Hero,  ed. Otto Penzler, BenBella Books, 2012, pp. 193–210. 
 "Tomato Red by Daniel Woodrell (1998)"Books to Die For, eds. John Connolly & Declan Burke, Hodder & Stoughton, 2012, pp. 649–654.

Poetry 
 The Lineup: Poems on Crime 2, ed. Gerald So, with Patrick Bagley, Richie Narvaez & Anthony Rainone, Poetic Justice Press, 2009.
 The Lineup: Poems on Crime 3, ed. Gerald So with Sarah Cortez, Richie Narvaez & AnthonyRainone, Poetic Justice Press, 2010.
 The Lineup: Poems on Crime 4, ed. Gerald So with Reed Farrel Coleman, Sarah Cortez, & Richie Narvaez, Poetic Justice Press, 2011.

Awards

Anthony Award 
 2006 Best Paperback Original - The James Deans - WINNER
 2010 Best Paperback Original - Tower (w/Ken Bruen) - finalist
 2012 Best Novel - Hurt Machine - finalist

Audie Award 
 2013 Original Work - Gun Church - WINNER

Barry Award 
 2006 Best Paperback Novel - The James Deans - WINNER
 2008 Best Novel - Soul Patch - finalist
 2012 Best Novel - Hurt Machine - finalist

Gumshoe Award 
 2006 Best Novel - The James Deans - finalist

Edgar Award 
 2006 Best Paperback Original - The James Deans - finalist
 2008 Best Novel - Soul Patch - finalist
 2014 Best Short Story - "The Terminal" in Kwik Krimes - finalist

Macavity Award 
 2006 Best Mystery Novel - The James Deans - finalist
 2010 Best Mystery Novel - Tower (w/Ken Bruen) - WINNER
 2008 Best Mystery Novel - Soul Patch - finalist
 2014 Best Mystery Short Story - "The Terminal" in Kwik Krimes - finalist

Shamus Award 
 2006 Best PI Paperback Original - The James Deans - WINNER
 2008 Best PI Hardcover - Soul Patch - WINNER
 2009 Best PI Hardcover - Empty Ever After - WINNER
2017 Best PI Hardcover - Where It Hurts - WINNER

References

External links 
 Official Web Site
 Mystery Writers of America University
 Publishers Weekly notes Robert B. Parker book deal
 Interview on Beaks and Geeks Podcast June 10, 2014, accessed July 29, 2014

1956 births
Living people
20th-century American novelists
21st-century American novelists
American mystery writers
Crime novelists
Hofstra University faculty
Anthony Award winners
Barry Award winners
Macavity Award winners
Shamus Award winners
People from Sheepshead Bay, Brooklyn
Writers from Brooklyn
American male novelists
20th-century American male writers
21st-century American male writers
Novelists from New York (state)
Brooklyn College alumni